Ralph Lief Erickson (June 25, 1902 – June 27, 2002) was a relief pitcher who played from  through  in Major League Baseball. A native of Dubois, Idaho, he attended Idaho State University. 
 
Erickson entered the majors in 1929 with the Pittsburgh Pirates, playing for them through the 1930 midseason. He posted a 1–0 record with an 8.40 earned run average in eight pitching appearances, allowing 15 runs (14 earned) on 23 hits while walking 12 batters and striking out two in 128 innings of work.

He also spent eight seasons in the minor leagues with the Pocatello Bannocks (1927), Boise Senators (1928), Columbia Comers (1929–30), Wichita Aviators (1930), Shreveport Sports (1931), Dallas Steers (1931–34) and St. Paul Saints (1934), registering a mark of 82–80 with a 3.40 ERA in 229 games, 54 of them as a starter.

Erickson was a longtime resident of Chandler, Arizona, where he died two days after his 100th birthday. At the time of his death, he was the oldest living former major league player.

See also
List of centenarians (Major League Baseball players)
List of centenarians (sportspeople)

Sources

External links

Major League Baseball pitchers
Pittsburgh Pirates players
Boise Senators players
Columbia Comers players
Dallas Steers players
Pocatello Bannocks players
Shreveport Sports players
St. Paul Saints (AA) players
Wichita Aviators players
Idaho State Bengals baseball players
Baseball players from Idaho
American centenarians
Men centenarians
1902 births
2002 deaths
People from Clark County, Idaho